Wendy Lloyd Pasmore, née Blood (9 October 1915 – 2015) was a British artist.

Early life
Pasmore was born in Dublin on 9 October 1915. She studied at the Chelmsford School of Art.

Career
In 1955 she was a member of the Women's International Art Club. She exhibited with the London Group from 1956, and became a member in 1958. Pasmore had a retrospective exhibition at the Molton and Lords Galleries in 1963. Her work is in the collection of Tate.

Personal life
In 1940 she married the artist and architect Victor Pasmore (1908–1998). They had two children, a son and a daughter. Pasmore died in 2015.

References

1915 births
2015 deaths
20th-century British women artists
British artists
Artists from Dublin (city)